David "Danny" Weberman (May 24, 1906 — September 16, 1983) was an American voice actor.

Early life
Webb was born on May 24, 1906, in New York City to Herman Weberman, a Hungarian Jewish furrier, and Lena (née Rubin) Weberman. Herman left Budapest and moved to the United States in 1887 and worked as a salesman.

Career
When Webb arrived in Hollywood, he was using the name Dave Weber. He did celebrity impersonations on the Burns & Allen anniversary show along with doing voice work for a Screen Gems cartoon called Sing Time, where he impersonated Bing Crosby, Rudy Vallee, Eddie Cantor, Andy Devine and others.
He started working for Warner Bros. in the mid-1930s and his first cartoon was The Coo-Coo Nut Grove. He also voiced Egghead in Daffy Duck & Egghead, Elmer Fudd in Cinderella Meets Fella (1938) and in Believe It or Else (1939). And Webb also did voices for the 1939 Merrie Melodies short A Day at the Zoo.

Webb, for a brief time, voiced the Disney character Goofy after Pinto Colvig had a falling out with Walt Disney and left the studio.

In 1941, after Mel Blanc signed a contract with Leon Schlesinger in which he exclusively did voice work for Warner Bros., Webb became the first person to succeed Blanc as the voice of Woody Woodpecker. He only voiced the character for one short before he enlisted in the army and was succeeded by Kent Rogers.

Webb enlisted in the U.S. Army Signal Corps, worked his way up to staff sergeant, and ended up entertaining troops in North Africa. Dwight D. Eisenhower was sufficiently impressed by his technique to deem him as 'Comedy Commando', a tag which stuck around for several years after World War II had ended. Webb later returned to radio, became the voice of Sad Sack, hosted the quiz show "Guess Who", and then had a minor career on local television sometime after 1951.

Death
Webb died on September 16, 1983, according to The New York Times; he was 77. He died of Parkinson's disease.

Filmography

Film

Radio

References

External links
 

1906 births
1983 deaths
Looney Tunes
American people of Hungarian-Jewish descent
American male voice actors
Male actors from New York City
United States Army personnel of World War II
Walter Lantz Productions people
United States Army non-commissioned officers